Vimala Rangachar (born 1929) is associated with fine arts and performing arts conservation movement of Karnataka, India. She holds positions of Chairperson of the Craft Council of Karanataka, Founder Member and President of M.E.S Institutions, President of the Natya Institute of Kathak and Choreography, President of the M.E.W.S Ladies Club, Malleshwaram, Bangalore, heading 
M.E.S Kalavedi, President of the Seva Sadan Orphanage, Hon. Secretary of the ADA Rangamandira, Committee Member, Gandhi Center for Science and Human Values – Bharathiya Vidya Bhavan. She is the daughter of Sri SK Ramanuja Iyengar and Ammanniamma.

Awards
Rangachar was awarded the Kamala Sanmaan in 2004.

References

Living people
1929 births